Kittle may refer to:

People
 Kittle (surname)

Places
 Kittle, Arkansas, an unincorporated community
 Kittle (Guyana), a kettle drum used in the music of Guyana
 Kittle, Swansea, an area of Pennard, Swansea, Wales

See also
 Kittel